Felipe Soares (born 22 July 1985), is a Brazilian footballer who plays as a left wingback for Danish fourth tier club FC Djursland.

Biography
In December 2006 he was signed by Standard along with Frederico Burgel Xavier and Marcos Camozzato. Internacional received a combined R$909,954 transfer fee, half of them was paid for Soares. In August 2007 he was signed by Roeselare along with Serhiy Kovalenko and Gabriel N'Galula, all offered 2-year contract.

Felipe returned to Brazil in January 2009 and signed a 4-year contract for Brasa, a proxy for Energy Sports.

Felipe Soares signed a contract until 30 November for Fortaleza in March 2009. However, in August 2009 his contract was terminated and Felipe left for Mirassol in 1-year deal. Mirassol participated in 2009 Campeonato Brasileiro Série D and 2010 Campeonato Paulista. Mirassol was a partner of Energy Sports until 2010. He was released by Brasa in July 2010.

In January 2011 Felipe was signed by Rio Grande do Sul club, Internacional de de Santa Maria.

In March 2011 Felipe was signed by Nacional Futebol Clube of Amazon until the end of 2011 Campeonato Amazonense.  In January 2012 Felipe was signed by Esportivo de Bento Gonçalves in -year deal.

Honours 
 Campeonato Gaúcho: 2004, 2005.

References

1985 births
Sportspeople from Rio Grande do Sul
Living people
Brazilian footballers
Sport Club Internacional players
Paysandu Sport Club players
Standard Liège players
K.S.V. Roeselare players
Avaí FC players
Association football defenders
FC Djursland players